Emerson Township, Nebraska may refer to one of the following places:

 Emerson Township, Dixon County, Nebraska
 Emerson Township, Harlan County, Nebraska

See also 
 Emerson Township (disambiguation)

Nebraska township disambiguation pages